Mritunjoy Banerjee was a former Indian association football player. He was part of the team that finished at second place at the 1964 AFC Asian Cup.

Honours

India
AFC Asian Cup runners-up: 1964

References

Indian footballers
India international footballers
1964 AFC Asian Cup players
Mohun Bagan AC
Footballers from West Bengal
Association football defenders
Calcutta Football League players